Amana edulis (formerly Tulipa edulis) is a flowering bulb that is native to China, Japan, and Korea.

Amana edulis is a bulb-forming perennial up to 25 cm tall. The flowers are white, streaked with purplish-red. The bulbs are edible and in some cases have been used medicinally.

References

External links

Chinese Plant Names
B. J. M. Zonneveld, The systematic value of nuclear genome size for “all” species of Tulipa L. (Liliaceae), Plant Systematics and Evolution Volume 281, Numbers 1-4 (2009), 217-245

Liliaceae
Flora of China
Flora of Eastern Asia
Plants described in 1867